Queer Eye for the Straight Girl is a spin-off of the television show Queer Eye for the Straight Guy. Straight Girl aired from January to May 2005. As the name suggests, the program focuses on makeovers for women while following the format of the original show. As opposed to the original show, which is mostly set in New York City, Queer Eye for the Straight Girl is set in Los Angeles. The hosts are called "The Gal Pals" and include three gay men and a lesbian. The show was unsuccessful and ended after the first season.

The Gal Pals
Robbie Laughlin ("The Look") – specializes in fashion and beauty tips.
Danny Teeson ("The Life") – specializes in lifestyle.
Damon Pease ("The Locale") – specializes in interior design and furniture.
Honey Labrador ("The Lady") – specializes in character building and expounds the three other areas.

Episodes

References

External links
 

2005 American television series debuts
2005 American television series endings
2000s American LGBT-related television series
2000s American reality television series
2000s LGBT-related reality television series
American LGBT-related reality television series
American television spin-offs
Bravo (American TV network) original programming
English-language television shows
Fashion-themed reality television series
Reality television spin-offs